Royal Route may refer to:
 , Czech Republic
 Royal Road, Persia
 , Poland 
 Royal Road, Kraków, Poland
 , Poland
 Royal Route, Warsaw, Poland
 , Poland
 Via Regia (Royal Highway):  name of several historic European roads